Bal-e-Jibril (or Gabriel's Wing; published in Urdu, 1935) was a philosophical poetry book of Allama Iqbal (Muhammad Iqbal), the great poet-philosopher of the Indian subcontinent.

Introduction

Iqbal's first book of poetry in Urdu, Bang-i-Dara (1924), was followed by Bal-i-Jibril in 1935 and Zarb-i-Kalim in 1936. Bal-i-Jibril is the peak of Iqbal's Urdu poetry. It consists of ghazals, poems, quatrains, epigrams and displays the vision and intellect necessary to foster sincerity and firm belief in the heart of the ummah and turn its members into true believers.

Some of the verses had been written when Iqbal visited Britain, Italy, Palestine, France, Spain and Afghanistan, including one of Iqbal's best known poems The Mosque of Cordoba.

The work contains 15 ghazals addressed to God and 61 ghazals and 22 quatrains dealing the ego, faith, love, knowledge, the intellect and freedom. The poet recalls the past glory of Muslims as he deals with contemporary political problems.

Contents

Introduction
Odes Part-I
 A blaze is raging near His Throne
 If the stars are astray
 Bright are Thy tresses, brighten them even more
 A free spirit I have, and seek no praise for it
 What avails love when life is so ephemeral?
 If my scattered dust turns into a heart again
 The world is tospy—turvy; the stars are wildly spinning
 O Cup—bearer! Give me again that wine of love for Thee
 My Lord has effaced the gulf between His world and mine
 Consuming fire for thee
 Dost Thou remember not my heart’s first rapture
 When flowers deck themselves into ruby bloom
 My power of making music
 I had believed my arena was under the starry heavens
 Reason is either luminous, or it seeks proofs
 O Lord! This world of Thine has a winsome face
Odes Part-II
Selfhood can demolish the magic of this world
Who sings this poignant song, blithe in spirit
The secret divine my ecstasy has taught
O myriad–coloured earth
Thou art yet region—bound
The dervish, in his freedom
The flowers are once more in radiant bloom
Muslims are born with a gift to charm, to persuade
It is love that infuses warmth into the music of life
With a heart unknown to a flame
The tongue and the heart
These Western nymphs
An illumined heart is supernal
Selfhood is daring in power, but has no pride
The leader is unworthy
Winter winds pierced me like a sharp sword
This ancient world
The way to renounce is
Reason is not far
Selfhood is an ocean boundless, fathomless
The morning breeze has whispered to me a secret
Thy vision and thy hands are chained, earth—bound
The only treasure reason has, is knowledge
Alexander’s burnished throne
Thou art not for the earth
In bondage of space
Reason has bestowed on me the eye of the wise
My plaint at last evoked
The sun, the moon, the stars
Every object has the urge
Is it a miracle,
Why should I ask wise men about my origin?
When the love of God teaches self—awareness
Explore the mysteries of’ fate, as I have done
This onrush of yearning
Let thy reason be close to nature
Alas! These men of church and mosque are known
Reason has devised again the magic of ancient days
Beyond the stars there are
The West seeks to make life a perpetual feast
Selfhood is Gabriel’s power
Does freshness of thought
As captured in a mirror
Sufis lack the fire, the passion that consumes
Intuition in the West was clever in its power
Cut the Gordian knot
Neither the power of kings
New worlds will he conquered
Arise! The bugle calls! It is time to leave!
The crescent has surpassed
Do not get engrossed In the dawning day and night
The training grounds of valour
Salman the mellifluous
Kings and crowns and armies
Stanza: The style may not he vivid and lively, still
Quatrains
All potent wine is emptied of Thy cask
Make our hearts the seats of mercy and love
Estranging are the ways in the holy precinct
O wave! Plunge headlong into the dark seas
Am I bound by space, or beyond space?

I was in the solitude of Selfhood lost
Confused is the nature of my love for Thee
Faith survives in fire, like Abraham
Observe the strains of' lily song:
My nature is like the fresh breeze of morn
A restless heart throb, in every atom
Thy vision is not lofty, ethereal
Neither the Muslim nor his power survives
Selfhood in the world of men is prophethood
Distracted are thy eyes in myriad ways
The beauty of mystic love is shaped in song
Where is the moving spirit of my life?
I am not a pursuer, nor a traveller
Thy bosom has breath; it does not have a heart
Pure in nature thou art, thy nature is light
Muslims have lost the passion of love they had
Conquer the world with the power of Selfhood
Dew—drops glisten on flowers that bloom in the spring
Reason is but a wayside lamp that gives
Give the young, O Lord, my passionate love for Thee
Thine is the world of birds and beasts, O Lord!
Thank Thee, O Lord, I am not without talent born
He is the essence of the worlds of space and spirit
Love is sometimes a wanderer in the woods
Love seeks sometimes the solitude of hills
Grant me the absorption of souls of the past
It was Abul Hassan who stressed the truth
This reason of mine knows not good from evil
To be God is to do a million tasks
So man is the powerful lord of land and seas!
The mystic's soul is like the morning breeze
That blood of pristine vigour is no more
The movement of days and nights is eternal, fast
Selfhood's apostate is the life of reason
Thy body knows not the secrets of thy heart
Stanza: Iqbal recited once in a garden in spring
Poems
A Prayer
The Mosque of Cordova
Spain
Tariq’s Prayer
Lenin before God
Song of the Angels
Ecstasy
To Javid
Mendicancy
The Mullah and Paradise
Church and State
The Earth is God's
To a Young Man
An Advice
The Wild Flower
To the ‘Saqi’
This Age
The Angels Bid Farewell to Adam
Adam is Received by the Spirit of the Earth
Rumi and Iqbal
Gabriel and Satan
Azan
Love
The Star's Message
To Javid
Philosophy and Religion
A Letter from Europe
At Napoleon’s Tomb
To the Punjab Peasant
Nadir Shah of Afghanistan
The Tartar's Dream
Worlds Apart
Cinema
To the Punjab Pirs
Separation
Monastery
Satan’s Petition
The Eagle
The Rebellious Disciple
Stanza: Barter not thy Selfhood for silver and gold
Stanza: The mentor exhorted his. disciples once

See also 
 Index of Muhammad Iqbal–related articles
 Javid Nama
 Payam-i-Mashriq
 Zabur-i-Ajam
 Pas Chih Bayad Kard ay Aqwam-i-Sharq
 Bang-e-Dara
 Asrar-i-Khudi
 Rumuz-e-Bekhudi
 Zarb-i-Kalim
 Armaghan-i-Hijaz

Notes

Further reading
 Schimmel, Annemarie (1963). Gabriel's Wing: Study into the Religious Ideas of Sir Muhammad Iqbal. Brill Archive. .

External links
Read online

Iqbal Academy, Pakistan

1935 poetry books
Islamic philosophical poetry books
Poetry by Muhammad Iqbal
Poetry collections